Sportverein Grödig is an Austrian association football club from Grödig. The team currently competes in the Regionalliga Salzburg, the third tier of Austrian football.

Grödig were relegated from the Austrian Bundesliga at the end of the 2015–16 season; however, they dropped down two levels to the Austrian Regional League West due to financial problems.

Honours
Austrian First League: 1
2012–13

European record

Notes
 2Q: Second qualifying round
 3Q: Third qualifying round

Current squad

Coaching staff
Head coach: Mario Messner
Assistant coach: Bernhard Kletzl
Goalkeeper coach: Alexander Trappl
Manager: Christian Haas
Sporting director: Daniel Burgstaller
Youth coach: Nedzad Selimovic
Team Supervisor: Rudi Codalonga
Physiotherapist: Katrin Lang

Managers
 Miroslav Bojčeski (20 Aug 2005 – 30 June 2006)
 Eduard Glieder (1 July 2006 – 30 June 2007)
 Heimo Pfeifenberger (1 July 2007 – 12 Dec 2008)
 Miroslav Bojčeski (14 Dec 2008 – 30 June 2009)
 Michael Brandner (1 July 2009 – 26 March 2010)
 Johann Davare (interim) (26 March 2010 – 3 April 2010)
 Heimo Pfeifenberger (4 April 2010 – 30 May 2012)
 Adi Hütter (1 June 2012 – 31 May 2014)
 Michael Baur (1 June 2014–15)
 Peter Schöttel (17 June 2015 – 16 May 2016)
 Andreas Fötschl (1 July 2016 – 31 Dec 2017)
 Mario Messner (1 January 2018 – present)

References

External links

Official site
Worldfootball.net profile
SV Grödig at weltfussballarchiv.com

Grodig
Association football clubs established in 1948
1948 establishments in Austria